is a Japanese actress. She is represented with Otona Keikaku.

Filmography

TV drama
NHK

Nippon TV

Tokyo Broadcasting System

Fuji Television

TV Asahi

TV Tokyo

Wowow

Variety programmes

Voice acting

Radio

Narration

Other programmes

Films

Advertisements

Music videos

Stage performances
Otona Keikaku-related performances

Other performances

References

External links
 

Japanese voice actresses
1979 births
Living people
Voice actresses from Osaka Prefecture
People from Suita
Japanese television actresses
Japanese film actresses